The Seudre is a river in the Charente-Maritime département, southwestern France, flowing into the Atlantic Ocean. Its source is near Saint-Genis-de-Saintonge. It flows northwest through Saint-André-de-Lidon, Saujon and La Tremblade. It flows into the Atlantic Ocean near Marennes. The lower course of the Seudre is brackish, and is used for oyster farming.

References

Rivers of France
Rivers of Nouvelle-Aquitaine
Rivers of Charente-Maritime
0Seudre